Criminal Activities is a 2015 American crime thriller film directed by Jackie Earle Haley in his directorial debut and written by Robert Lowell. The film stars John Travolta, Michael Pitt, Dan Stevens, Christopher Abbott, Edi Gathegi, Rob Brown and Jackie Earle Haley. The film was released on November 20, 2015, by RLJ Entertainment and Image Entertainment.

Plot
Four young men invest borrowed money in a company guaranteed to return their venture capital tenfold or more. It does not seem to trouble them that the privileged information on which they are acting was derived from insider trading. Two little things go wrong. The company suddenly folds under the pressure of federal scrutiny and their financial benefactor turns out to be a high-powered mobster.

The mobster, named Eddie (John Travolta), offers them a way out of their awkward situation. They are to kidnap and hold a man for 24 hours before turning him over to Eddie and his two-man wrecking crew. This action will clear their massive debt with him, and everyone will cheerfully go their separate ways. But a couple more annoying little inconveniences crop up. One of them is that the kidnap victim is related to an underworld kingpin who offers a two million dollar reward to the first one to recover his nephew. Another is that the four kidnappers are now required to collectively murder their victim before being allowed to leave the building alive.

Adding to these contingencies is the fact that things are not at all what they seem. Perceived motivations may turn out to be vastly different from actual motivations. What at first seemed patently predictable is anything but.

Cast
 John Travolta as Eddie
 Michael Pitt as Zach
 Dan Stevens as Noah
 Rob Brown as Bryce
 Christopher Abbott as Warren
 Edi Gathegi as Marques
 Jackie Earle Haley as Gerry

Production

Filming
The shooting of the film began on May 27, 2014 in Cleveland, Ohio and finished on June 26. A list of road closures was published by the news. Previously planned to be set in Detroit, it was eventually set in Cleveland.

Release
The film was acquired by Image Entertainment for a planned fall 2015 release in the United States and the United Kingdom.

Reception
Criminal Activities received mixed reviews. On Rotten Tomatoes, it holds a 50% score, and an average rating of 5.9/10, sampled from 20 reviews. Metacritic gives a score of 51 out of 100, based on 9 reviews, indicating "mixed or average reviews".

References

External links
 

2015 films
Films shot in Cleveland
Films set in Cleveland
2015 crime thriller films
American crime thriller films
2015 directorial debut films
2010s English-language films
2010s American films